National Guard is the name used by a wide variety of current and historical uniformed organizations in different countries. The original National Guard was formed during the French Revolution around a cadre of defectors from the French Guards.

National Guard may refer to:

Africa 
 National Guard (Mauritania)
 Tunisian National Guard, a separate military force of Tunisia

Americas 
 National Guard (Brazil) (1831–1918), a paramilitary militia created to support the Brazilian Army
 National Guard (El Salvador) (1912–1992), the Salvadoran gendarmerie
 National Guard (Mexico), a gendarmerie created in 2019.
 National Guard (Nicaragua) (1925–1979), a militia and gendarmerie created during the occupation by the United States
 National Guard (United States), military reserves organized by each of the 50 U.S. states, territories, D.C. and administered by the National Guard Bureau;
 Army National Guard, a reserve force of the United States Army which functions as the ground component of the state-level militia while not in federal service
 Air National Guard, a reserve force of the United States Air Force which functions as the air component of the state-level militia while not in federal service
 Venezuelan National Guard (Guardia Nacional de Venezuela), the gendarmerie component of the National Armed Forces of Venezuela

Asia 
 Azerbaijani National Guard, an armed force of the Government of Azerbaijan, and operates as a semi-independent entity
 National Guard (Bahrain), a separate military force in Bahrain that serves both as defence force and as a security force
 National Guard (Iraq), part of the new Military of Iraq absorbed by the Iraqi Army
 National Guard of Kazakhstan
 National Guard (Kyrgyzstan), one of the regiments of the Armed Forces of the Republic of Kyrgyzstan
 Kuwait National Guard, an internal and border security force, part of Kuwait Military Forces
 National Guard (Pakistan), a paramilitary force mainly charged with border patrols and air defences
 Saudi Arabian National Guard, one of the three major branches of the Armed Forces of the Kingdom of Saudi Arabia
 Sri Lanka National Guard, the largest regiment in the Sri Lanka Army
 Presidential National Guard, a special operations branch of the Tajik Armed Forces
 Turkmen National Guard
 Uzbekistan National Guard

Europe 
 National Guards Unit of Bulgaria, successor of the Personal Cavalry Convoy of Knyaz Alexander I, re-established in 2001
 Cypriot National Guard, combined arms military force of the Republic of Cyprus
 Estonian Defence League, unified paramilitary armed forces of the Republic of Estonia
 White Guard (Finland) (1918–1944), voluntary militia of the "Whites", who opposed the "Reds" in the Finnish Civil War of 1918
 National Guard (France), militias formed in each city from the time of the French Revolution to the Paris Commune, re-established after several terrorist attacks in 2016
 National Guard of Georgia, a military structure within the Georgian Armed Forces
 National Guard (Greece), a military structure within the Hellenic Army
 National Guard (Ireland), better known as the Blueshirts, a 1930s political movement in Ireland
 National Republican Guard (Italy), (1943-1945), a paramilitary force of the Italian Social Republic
 Latvian National Guard, a volunteer paramilitary armed force, part of National Armed Forces of Latvia
 National Republican Guard (Portugal), the gendarmerie of Portugal
 National Guard of Russia, gendarmerie force of Russia, formed in 2016
 National Militia (Spain), 19th century quasi-military force 
 National Guard of Ukraine, formed 1991–2000 and 2014–current

See also
Internal Troops
Presidential Guard (disambiguation)
Republican guard
Territorial Army (UK)

Types of military forces
Gendarmerie

se:Nationalgarde